Dirt track racing is a type of auto racing performed on oval tracks throughout the United Kingdom. Dirt ovals outnumber all other types of tracks combined. Tracks are also used for the motorcycle sport Speedway and other Track racing events.

See also
List of dirt track ovals in the United Kingdom

External links
BriSCA F1 - British Stock Car Association
NASA National Autograss Sport Association Ltd.
Rebels Racing
SSCA Saloon Stock Car Association
Dirt Track Riders Association

United Kingdom
Motorsport in the United Kingdom